Stockholm, My Love is a 2016 drama film and musical film starring Neneh Cherry. Set in Stockholm, it features music by the likes of Benny Andersson from ABBA.

References

External links
  at IMDb

Swedish documentary films
Films directed by Mark Cousins
British documentary films
2010s British films
2010s Swedish films